Steel Preferred is a 1925 American silent drama film directed by James P. Hogan and starring Vera Reynolds, William Boyd, and Hobart Bosworth. The film portrays a power struggle at a steelworks.

Plot
As described in a film magazine review, Wally Gay, a young furnace man’s helper in a steel mill, is eager to become a mill owner, and to that end tries to submit to the mill owner for whom he works a new plan for installing a battery of furnaces. He is spurred on by his love for Amy Creeth, the mill owner’s daughter. His enemy in his plan for the mill is the nephew of the acting superintendent of the mill, who also seeks to win the affection of the young woman. Many complications arise out of the plans for the new furnaces, including a spill of molten metal near Amy and a strike by the mill workers, but the young tender’s helper finally has his plan for the mill adopted and also wins the love of the young woman.

Cast

Preservation
With no prints of Steel Preferred located in any film archives, it is a lost film.

References

Bibliography
 Munden, Kenneth White. The American Film Institute Catalog of Motion Pictures Produced in the United States, Part 1. University of California Press, 1997.

External links

1925 films
1925 drama films
Silent American drama films
Films directed by James Patrick Hogan
American silent feature films
1920s English-language films
American black-and-white films
Producers Distributing Corporation films
Lost American films
1925 lost films
Lost drama films
1920s American films